Bywy Creek may refer to:

Bywy Creek (Choctaw County, Mississippi)
By-Wy Creek (Biba Wila Creek tributary)